Pterotopteryx is a genus of moths in the family Alucitidae. The genus was described by Hans-Joachim Hannemann in 1959.

Species
Pterotopteryx colchica Zagulajev, 1992
Pterotopteryx dodecadactyla Hübner, 1813
Pterotopteryx koreana Byun, 2006
Pterotopteryx lonicericola Kuznetsov, 1978
Pterotopteryx monticola Zagulajev, 1992
Pterotopteryx nigrifasciata Byun & Park, 2007
Pterotopteryx spilodesma (Meyrick, 1907)
Pterotopteryx synaphodactyla (Alphéraky, 1876)
Pterotopteryx tshatkalica Zagulajev, 1995
Pterotopteryx vietana Byun & Park, 2007

References

Ditrysia genera
Alucitidae